Jeff Pitchell (born April 11, 1966 in Hartford, Connecticut, United States) is an American singer, songwriter, guitarist, recording artist, instructor, and actor who is inducted into the Connecticut Blues Hall of Fame. He leads the band Jeff Pitchell and Texas Flood performing original and classic rock selections. Based in Rocky Hill, Connecticut, Pitchell has performed throughout the United States as well as internationally.

Life and career
Pitchell earned early recognition for his guitar prowess at the age of 15 by winning the Best Guitarist in State of Connecticut contest held at the University of Hartford. He has since won numerous additional awards for music performance and recording. Pitchell set aside a teaching career to pursue his true passion: playing the guitar and entertaining people. Pitchell and Texas Flood recently won recognition as the Best Blues Band Show in New England.

Performances
Pitchell in 2014 performed Southbound with the Allman Brothers Band at the Beacon Theatre in New York. This performance was recorded and released on Peach Records/Munck Music in March 2014. He has also performed and/or recorded with Phil Lesh, Rick Derringer, Bo Diddley, B.B. King, Buddy Guy, Ted Nugent, Clarence Clemons, Dave Mason, James Cotton, Fabulous Thunderbirds, NRBQ, John Mayall, Jimmie Vaughan, Kenny Wayne Shepherd, Peter Tork, Dickey Betts, and The Commitments. Pitchell has appeared on national TV and radio, including for the World Champion Boston Red Sox at Fenway Park, and for Don Imus on his radio and TV show on MSNBC.

Associations
Pitchell has collaborated with many internationally recognized performers; Michael Allman (Gregg Allman’s son), Claudette King (B.B. King's daughter), Sheila Raye (Ray Charles daughter, James Montgomery, J. Geils, Charles Neville, and Carla Cooke (Sam Cooke's daughter).

Awards and recognition
He was inducted into Connecticut Blues Hall of Fame in 2018.  Heavy Hitter was listed on the national Billboard Top Blues Album Chart at No. 7, where the majority of the songs on the album were written by Pitchell. He won the "Best Guitarist" in the State of Connecticut at age 15. He has won numerous awards since, including two songwriting awards from the Great American Songwriting Contest. The International Songwriting Contest (ISC) judge and blues musician, John Mayall, subsequently recorded Pitchell's song "An Eye for an Eye" on one of his albums. Pitchell and his band, Texas Flood, won the Best Blues Act in New England in a six-state vote.

Discography
Fat Cigars (1997, Premier)
One Day Away (1999, Premier)
Face To Face (2001, Premier)
Heavy Hitter (2002, Pyramid/EMI)
One For The Fans (2006, Premier)Rockin' Songs for Kids (2010, Premier)American Girl (2010, Vizztone)Allman Brothers Band (Peach/Munck Music)Playin' With My Friends'' (2023, Deguello)

References

External links
Official website

1966 births
Living people
American blues singers
American blues guitarists
American rock singers
American rock guitarists
Musicians from Hartford, Connecticut
Songwriters from Connecticut